Weidner Ridge is a ridge named after George A. Weidner, Dept. of Meteorology, University of Wisconsin; along with Charles R. Stearns, Weidner developed the use of automatic weather stations in Antarctica for ten seasons, 1982–92.

Ridges of Victoria Land
Scott Coast